is a passenger railway station in located in the city of  Tsu, Mie Prefecture, Japan, operated by Central Japan Railway Company (JR Tōkai).

Lines
Ieki Station is served by the Meishō Line, and is 25.8 rail kilometers from the terminus of the line at Matsusaka Station.

Station layout
The station consists of two opposed side platforms connected by a level crossing. However, from October 8, 2009 to 26 March, 2016, platform 2 was not used.

Platforms

Adjacent stations

History 
Ieki Station was opened on September 11, 1931 as a station on the Japanese Government Railways (JGR) (which became the Japan National Railways (JNR) after World War II). Until December 5, 1935, the station was the terminus of the line.
Along with the division and privatization of JNR on April 1, 1987, the station came under the control and operation of the Central Japan Railway Company.

There were two incidents of train runaway involving this station on August 20, 2006, and April 19, 2009. There were no casualties from either of the incidents.

Between October 8, 2009 and March 26, 2016, the section between Ieki and Ise-Okitsu was closed due to the damages incurred from Typhoon Melor. During this time, a bus service ran between the stations.

Passenger statistics
In fiscal 2019, the station was used by an average of 232 passengers daily (boarding passengers only).

Surrounding area
Mie Prefectural Hakusan High School
Ieki Post Office
Iejo Castle Ruins

See also
 List of railway stations in Japan

References

External links

JR Central home page

Railway stations in Japan opened in 1931
Railway stations in Mie Prefecture
Tsu, Mie